Margunn Ebbesen (born 4 September 1962) is a Norwegian politician for the Conservative Party. She was elected to the Parliament of Norway from Nordland in 2013 where she is member of the Standing Committee on Justice.

References 

Conservative Party (Norway) politicians
Members of the Storting
Nordland politicians
1962 births
Living people
21st-century Norwegian politicians